Charles Edward Stewart (6 September 1881 – 1965) was a British sport shooter who competed in the 1912 Summer Olympics.

In 1912 he won the bronze medal in the individual 50 metre pistol event. He also won two bronze medals as member of the British team in the team 30 metre military pistol event as well as in the team 50 metre military pistol competition.

References

External links
Charles Stewart's profile at databaseOlympics

1881 births
1965 deaths
British male sport shooters
ISSF pistol shooters
Olympic shooters of Great Britain
Shooters at the 1912 Summer Olympics
Olympic bronze medallists for Great Britain
Olympic medalists in shooting
Medalists at the 1912 Summer Olympics